The 2020 Oklahoma Sooners baseball team represents the University of Oklahoma during the 2020 NCAA Division I baseball season. The Sooners play their home games at L. Dale Mitchell Baseball Park as a member of the Big 12 Conference. They are led by head coach Skip Johnson, in his 3rd season at Oklahoma.

On March 13, the Big 12 Conference canceled the remainder of the season due to the Coronavirus pandemic.

Previous season
The 2019 Oklahoma Sooners baseball team notched a 33–21 (11–13) regular season record and finished sixth in the Big 12 Conference standings. The Sooners reached the 2019 Big 12 Conference baseball tournament, where they were defeated by Baylor and TCU. Oklahoma did not receive an at-large bid to the 2019 NCAA Division I baseball tournament.

Personnel

Coaching staff

Roster

Schedule and results

! style=";color:white;" | Regular Season (14–4)
|- valign="top" 

|- bgcolor="#ffbbbb"
| February 14 || 6:00 pm ||  || Virginia* || #30 || Admiral Fetterman Field • Pensacola, FL || L0–6 || McGarry(1–0) || Cavalli(0–1) ||  || 780 || 0–1 || – || StatsStory
|- bgcolor="#bbffbb"
| February 15 || 1:00 pm ||  || Virginia* || #30 || Admiral Fetterman Field • Pensacola, FL || W7–2 || Matthews(1–0) || Harrington(0–1) ||  ||  || 1–1 || – || StatsStory
|- bgcolor="#bbffbb"
| February 15 || 4:00 pm ||  || Virginia* || #30 || Admiral Fetterman Field • Pensacola, FL || W5–1 || Olds(1–0) || Schoch(0–1) || Ruffcorn(1) || 1,422 || 2–1 || – || StatsStory
|- bgcolor="#bbffbb"
| February 18 || 3:00 pm ||  || * ||  || L. Dale Mitchell Baseball Park • Norman, OK || W14–1 || Abram(1–0) || Hansen(0–1) ||  || 392 || 3–1 || – || StatsStory
|- bgcolor="#bbffbb"
| February 19 || 3:00 pm ||  || Texas Southern* ||  || L. Dale Mitchell Baseball Park • Norman, OK || W12–1 || Bennett(1–0) || Kindervater(0–2) ||  || 407 || 4–1 || – || StatsStory
|- bgcolor="#bbffbb"
| February 21 || 3:00 pm ||  || * ||  || L. Dale Mitchell Baseball Park • Norman, OK || W2–1 || Cavalli(1–1) || Johnson(0–2) || Ruffcorn(2) ||  || 5–1 || – || StatsStory
|- bgcolor="#bbffbb"
| February 21 || 6:00 pm ||  || Illinois State* ||  || L. Dale Mitchell Baseball Park • Norman, OK || W4–1 || Olds(2–0) || Wicklund(0–1) || Ruffcorn(3) || 591 || 6–1 || – || StatsStory
|- bgcolor="#bbffbb"
| February 22 || 12:00 pm ||  || Illinois State* ||  || L. Dale Mitchell Baseball Park • Norman, OK || W3–2 || Brooks(1–0) || Kubiatowicz(0–1) || Godman(1) ||  || 7–1 || – || StatsStory
|- bgcolor="#ffbbbb"
| February 22 || 3:00 pm ||  || Illinois State* ||  || L. Dale Mitchell Baseball Park • Norman, OK || L5–7 || Sebby(1–0) || Acker(0–1) || Bronke(1) || 794 || 7–2 || – || StatsStory
|- bgcolor="#bbffbb"
| February 28 || 3:00 pm ||  || Arkansas* ||  || Minute Maid Park • Houston, TX || W6–3 || Olds(3–0) || Kopps(0–1) || Ruffcorn(4) ||  || 8–2 || – || StatsStory
|- bgcolor="#ffbbbb"
| February 29 || 11:00 am ||  || Missouri* ||  || Minute Maid Park • Houston, TX || L7–810 || Dillard(2–0) || Brooks(1–1) || – || 521 || 8–3 || – || StatsStory
|-

|- bgcolor="#bbffbb"
| March 1 || 11:00 am ||  || #19 LSU* ||  || Minute Maid Park • Houston, TX || W1–0 || Acker(1–1) || Labas(1–2) || – ||  || 9–3 || – || StatsStory
|- bgcolor="#bbffbb"
| March 3 || 6:30 pm ||  || Dallas Baptist* || #28 || L. Dale Mitchell Baseball Park • Norman, OK || W10–3 || Olds(4–0) || Heaton(1–2) || – || 773 || 10–3 || – || StatsStory
|- bgcolor="#bbffbb"
| March 4 || 6:30 pm ||  || * || #28 || L. Dale Mitchell Baseball Park • Norman, OK || W13–2 || Bennett(2–0) || Barker(0–2) || – || 588 || 11–3 || – || StatsStory
|- bgcolor="#ffbbbb"
| March 6 || 6:30 pm ||  || * || #28 || L. Dale Mitchell Baseball Park • Norman, OK || L4–5 || Paredes(1–1) || Cavalli(1–2) || Schmitt(6) || 919 || 11–4 || – || StatsStory
|- bgcolor="#bbffbb"
| March 7 || 2:00 pm ||  || San Diego State* || #28 || L. Dale Mitchell Baseball Park • Norman, OK || W8–4 || Prater(1–0) || Melton(3–1) || – || 1,311 || 12–4 || – || StatsStory
|- bgcolor="#bbffbb"
| March 8 || 1:00 pm ||  || San Diego State* || #28 || L. Dale Mitchell Baseball Park • Norman, OK || W9–810 || Ruffcorn(1–0) || Schmitt(0–1) || – || 699 || 13–4 || – || StatsStory
|- bgcolor="#bbffbb"
| March 10 || 6:30 pm ||  || at UT Arlington* || #28 || Clay Gould Ballpark • Arlington, TX || W3–0 || Bennett(3–0) || Winquest(1–1) || Ruffcorn(5) || 936 || 14–4 || – || StatsStory
|- align="center" bgcolor="lightgrey"
| March 12 || 8:00 pm ||  || at * || #28 || Robin Baggett Stadium • San Luis Obispo, CA ||  ||  ||  ||  ||  ||  ||  || 
|- align="center" bgcolor="lightgrey"
| March 13 || 8:00 pm ||  || at Cal Poly* || #28 || Robin Baggett Stadium • San Luis Obispo, CA ||  ||  ||  ||  ||  ||  ||  || 
|- align="center" bgcolor="lightgrey"
| March 14 || 6:00 pm ||  || at Cal Poly* || #28 || Robin Baggett Stadium • San Luis Obispo, CA ||  ||  ||  ||  ||  ||  ||  || 
|- align="center" bgcolor="lightgrey"
| March 15 || 3:00 pm ||  || at Cal Poly* || #28 || Robin Baggett Stadium • San Luis Obispo, CA ||  ||  ||  ||  ||  ||  ||  || 
|- align="center" bgcolor="lightgrey"
| March 17 || 6:00 pm ||  || Arkansas* ||  || Chickasaw Bricktown Ballpark • Oklahoma City, OK ||  ||  ||  ||  ||  ||  ||  || 
|- align="center" bgcolor="lightgrey"
| March 20 || 6:30 pm ||  || Texas ||  || L. Dale Mitchell Baseball Park • Norman, OK ||  ||  ||  ||  ||  ||  ||  || 
|- align="center" bgcolor="lightgrey"
| March 21 || 2:00 pm || FSOK || Texas ||  || L. Dale Mitchell Baseball Park • Norman, OK ||  ||  ||  ||  ||  ||  ||  || 
|- align="center" bgcolor="lightgrey"
| March 22 || 2:00 pm || FSOK || Texas ||  || L. Dale Mitchell Baseball Park • Norman, OK ||  ||  ||  ||  ||  ||  ||  || 
|- align="center" bgcolor="lightgrey"
| March 24 || 6:30 pm ||  || at Dallas Baptist* ||  || Horner Ballpark • Dallas, TX ||  ||  ||  ||  ||  ||  ||  || 
|- align="center" bgcolor="lightgrey"
| March 27 || 6:30 pm ||  || at TCU ||  || Lupton Stadium • Fort Worth, TX ||  ||  ||  ||  ||  ||  ||  || 
|- align="center" bgcolor="lightgrey"
| March 28 || 2:00 pm || FSSW+ || at TCU ||  || Lupton Stadium • Fort Worth, TX ||  ||  ||  ||  ||  ||  ||  || 
|- align="center" bgcolor="lightgrey"
| March 29 || 12:00 pm || ESPNU || at TCU ||  || Lupton Stadium • Fort Worth, TX ||  ||  ||  ||  ||  ||  ||  || 
|- align="center" bgcolor="lightgrey"
| March 31 || 6:30 pm ||  || Oklahoma State ||  || ONEOK Field • Tulsa, OK ||  ||  ||  ||  ||  ||  ||  || 
|-

|- align="center" bgcolor="lightgrey"
| April 3 || 6:30 pm || FSOK+ ||  ||  || L. Dale Mitchell Baseball Park • Norman, OK ||  ||  ||  ||  ||  ||  ||  || 
|- align="center" bgcolor="lightgrey"
| April 4 || 6:30 pm || ESPNU || Baylor ||  || L. Dale Mitchell Baseball Park • Norman, OK ||  ||  ||  ||  ||  ||  ||  || 
|- align="center" bgcolor="lightgrey"
| April 5 || 2:00 pm || FSSW+ || Baylor ||  || L. Dale Mitchell Baseball Park • Norman, OK ||  ||  ||  ||  ||  ||  ||  || 
|- align="center" bgcolor="lightgrey"
| April 7 || 6:30 pm ||  || * ||  || L. Dale Mitchell Baseball Park • Norman, OK ||  ||  ||  ||  ||  ||  ||  || 
|- align="center" bgcolor="lightgrey"
| April 9 || 6:30 pm || FSSW || at Texas Tech ||  || Dan Law Field • Lubbock, TX ||  ||  ||  ||  ||  ||  ||  || 
|- align="center" bgcolor="lightgrey"
| April 10 || 8:00 pm || ESPNU || at Texas Tech ||  || Dan Law Field • Lubbock, TX ||  ||  ||  ||  ||  ||  ||  || 
|- align="center" bgcolor="lightgrey"
| April 11 || 2:00 pm || FSSW+ || at Texas Tech ||  || Dan Law Field • Lubbock, TX ||  ||  ||  ||  ||  ||  ||  || 
|- align="center" bgcolor="lightgrey"
| April 14 || 6:00 pm || FSOK+ || * ||  || L. Dale Mitchell Baseball Park • Norman, OK ||  ||  ||  ||  ||  ||  ||  || 
|- align="center" bgcolor="lightgrey"
| April 17 || 6:30 pm || FSOK+ || Oklahoma State ||  || L. Dale Mitchell Baseball Park • Norman, OK ||  ||  ||  ||  ||  ||  ||  || 
|- align="center" bgcolor="lightgrey"
| April 18 || 6:00 pm || ESPN+ || at Oklahoma State ||  || O'Brate Stadium • Stillwater, OK ||  ||  ||  ||  ||  ||  ||  || 
|- align="center" bgcolor="lightgrey"
| April 19 || 4:00 pm || ESPNU || at Oklahoma State ||  || O'Brate Stadium • Stillwater, OK ||  ||  ||  ||  ||  ||  ||  || 
|- align="center" bgcolor="lightgrey"
| April 21 || 6:00 pm ||  || at Oral Roberts* ||  || J. L. Johnson Stadium • Tulsa, OK ||  ||  ||  ||  ||  ||  ||  || 
|- align="center" bgcolor="lightgrey"
| April 24 || 6:30 pm ||  || * ||  || L. Dale Mitchell Baseball Park • Norman, OK ||  ||  ||  ||  ||  ||  ||  || 
|- align="center" bgcolor="lightgrey"
| April 25 || 2:00 pm || FSOK || Sam Houston State* ||  || L. Dale Mitchell Baseball Park • Norman, OK ||  ||  ||  ||  ||  ||  ||  || 
|- align="center" bgcolor="lightgrey"
| April 26 || 1:00 pm ||  || Sam Houston State* ||  || L. Dale Mitchell Baseball Park • Norman, OK ||  ||  ||  ||  ||  ||  ||  || 
|- align="center" bgcolor="lightgrey"
| April 28 || 6:00 pm ||  || at Wichita State* ||  || Eck Stadium • Wichita, KS ||  ||  ||  ||  ||  ||  ||  || 
|-

|- align="center" bgcolor="lightgrey"
| May 1 || 6:00 pm ||  || at  ||  || Hoglund Ballpark • Lawrence, KS ||  ||  ||  ||  ||  ||  ||  || 
|- align="center" bgcolor="lightgrey"
| May 2 || 2:00 pm ||  || at Kansas ||  || Hoglund Ballpark • Lawrence, KS ||  ||  ||  ||  ||  ||  ||  || 
|- align="center" bgcolor="lightgrey"
| May 3 || 1:00 pm ||  || at Kansas ||  || Hoglund Ballpark • Lawrence, KS ||  ||  ||  ||  ||  ||  ||  || 
|- align="center" bgcolor="lightgrey"
| May 8 || 6:30 pm ||  ||  ||  || L. Dale Mitchell Baseball Park • Norman, OK ||  ||  ||  ||  ||  ||  ||  || 
|- align="center" bgcolor="lightgrey"
| May 9 || 4:00 pm || FSOK+ || Kansas State ||  || L. Dale Mitchell Baseball Park • Norman, OK ||  ||  ||  ||  ||  ||  ||  || 
|- align="center" bgcolor="lightgrey"
| May 10 || 1:00 pm ||  || Kansas State ||  || L. Dale Mitchell Baseball Park • Norman, OK ||  ||  ||  ||  ||  ||  ||  || 
|- align="center" bgcolor="lightgrey"
| May 14 || 6:30 pm || FSOK+ ||  ||  || L. Dale Mitchell Baseball Park • Norman, OK ||  ||  ||  ||  ||  ||  ||  || 
|- align="center" bgcolor="lightgrey"
| May 15 || 6:30 pm ||  || West Virginia ||  || L. Dale Mitchell Baseball Park • Norman, OK ||  ||  ||  ||  ||  ||  ||  || 
|- align="center" bgcolor="lightgrey"
| May 16 || 2:00 pm || FSOK || West Virginia ||  || L. Dale Mitchell Baseball Park • Norman, OK ||  ||  ||  ||  ||  ||  ||  || 
|-

| style="font-size:88%" | Legend:       = Win       = Loss       = Canceled      Bold = Oklahoma team member
|-
| style="font-size:88%" | "#" represents ranking. All rankings from Collegiate Baseball on the date of the contest."()" represents postseason seeding in the Big 12 Tournament or NCAA Regional, respectively.

Rankings

2020 MLB draft

References

Oklahoma Sooners
Oklahoma Sooners baseball seasons
Oklahoma Sooners baseball